Durant's Never Closes is a 2016 American biographical mystery thriller film directed by Travis Mills, starring Tom Sizemore, Michelle Stafford, Peter Bogdanovich and Jon Gries. The film is based on Jack Durant, a restaurateur from Phoenix, Arizona.

Cast
 Tom Sizemore as Jack Durant
 Michelle Stafford as Suzie
 Peter Bogdanovich as George
 Jon Gries as Dizzy Dean
 Mark Grossman as College Kid
 Bill Wetherill as Truck Driver
 Kristi Lawrence as Food Critic
 Rob Edwards as Rude Man
 Frank Prell as Bus Boy
 Travis Mills as Investigator
 Greg Lutz as Doctor
 Barbara McBain as B.J. Thompson

Release
The film was released in the United States on 22 January 2016.

Reception
John Townsend of Starburst rated the film 5 stars out of 10 and wrote that at the film's "occasional best", it is an "eye-catching one man show", but at its worst feels "plodding and slow, with curious tonal shifts".

Bill Goodykoontz of The Arizona Republic rated the film 2.5 stars out of 5 and called Mills' direction "assured" and the film's "high point", writing that he "stages scenes with skill", while Sizemore is "all over the place as Durant".

Robrt L. Pela of Phoenix New Times wrote that the film "plays like a frenetic fever dream, with a rambling narrative that never gets going", but praised Sizemore's performance, writing that "What might have been a laughable caricature becomes instead an extra-human performance."

References

External links
 
 

American biographical films
American mystery thriller films
2010s biographical films
2010s mystery thriller films